Stanislav Dubrovsky (born 5 July 1974) is a Russian skier. He competed in the Nordic combined event at the 1994 Winter Olympics.

References

External links
 

1974 births
Living people
Russian male Nordic combined skiers
Olympic Nordic combined skiers of Russia
Nordic combined skiers at the 1994 Winter Olympics
Sportspeople from Saint Petersburg